Sigolène Vinson (born 1974) is a former lawyer and actress who became a novelist and journalist. She is the legal correspondent of Charlie Hebdo, where she survived the shooting on 7 January 2015.

Life
Vinson was born at Sainte-Foy-lès-Lyon. Her family moved shortly afterwards to Clamart and then Meudon near Paris, before leaving for Djibouti because of her father's job in 1981. She returned to France in 1987. She studied for the stage but later retrained at the Sorbonne to become a lawyer.

In 2007 she gave up the law to become a writer. In the same year she was awarded jointly with Philippe Kleinmann the Prix du roman d'aventures for their crime novel Bistouri Blues, the first appearance of the commissaire Cush Dibbeth, who reappeared in Substance (2015). In 2011 they co-wrote an historical crime novel, Double Hélice. In the same year Vinson's solo novel J'ai déserté le pays de l’enfance was also published.

Since September 2012 she has written a legal column for Charlie Hebdo. During the shooting on 7 January 2015 her life was spared by Saïd Kouachi, because she was a woman, on condition that she read the Koran.

Works

Novels 
 J'ai déserté le pays de l'enfance, Paris, Plon, 2011 
 Le Caillou, Paris, Le Tripode, 2015 
 Courir après les ombres, Paris, Plon, 2015 
 Les Jouisseurs, Paris, Éditions de l'Observatoire, 2017 
 Maritima, Paris, Éditions de l'Observatoire, 2019 
 La Canine de George, Paris, Éditions de l'Observatoire, 2021

In collaboration with Philippe Kleinmann 
 Bistouri Blues, Paris, Éditions du Masque, Collection Le Masque No 2507, 2007  ; reissued, Paris, Éditions du Masque, Collection Masque poche No 57, 2015 
 Double Hélice, Paris, Éditions du Masque, 2011 
 Substance, Paris, Éditions du Masque, 2015

Contributions to works of multiple authorship 
 Les Aventures du Concierge Masqué - L'Exquise Nouvelle saison 3, L'exquise Édition, 2013
 Enfant, je me souviens, UNICEF/Livre de poche, 2016

Notes and references

External links 

 Babelio: biography and bibliography

Living people
1974 births
Charlie Hebdo people
French women lawyers
French actresses
French women journalists
French women novelists
People from Sainte-Foy-lès-Lyon